Cleve or Cleves may refer to:

Places
 The historical Duchy of Cleves
 Kleve, a town in Germany known historically in English as Cleves
 Cleve, South Australia, a town, Australia
 Cleve, a colonial plantation in King George County, Virginia, United States
 "The Cleve", a nickname for Cleveland, Ohio, United States
 Cleves, Ohio, a village, United States

People
 Cleve (given name)
 Cleve (surname)
 Schoolboy Cleve (1925–2008), American harmonica player

Other uses
 Cleve RFC, an English amateur rugby union club

See also
 Anne of Cleves
 Kleve (disambiguation)
 Cleave (disambiguation)